Robert Houman (born 29 September 1927) is a Belgian former sports shooter. He competed in the 50 metre rifle, prone event at the 1972 Summer Olympics.

References

External links
 

1927 births
Possibly living people
Belgian male sport shooters
Olympic shooters of Belgium
Shooters at the 1972 Summer Olympics
People from Ath
Sportspeople from Hainaut (province)